Saros cycle series 150 for lunar eclipses occurs at the moon's ascending node, 18 years 11 and 1/3 days. It contains 71 events.

This lunar saros is linked to Solar Saros 157.

See also 
 List of lunar eclipses
 List of Saros series for lunar eclipses

Notes

External links 
 www.hermit.org: Saros 148

Lunar saros series